Qaşqaçay (also, Kashkachay) is a village in the Dashkasan Rayon of Azerbaijan. The area holds rich copper reserves whose mining concession was awarded for 30 years to a Turkish company, Artvin Madan, part of the Cengiz Holding conglomerate. The contract signing ceremony was held in September 2021.

References 

Populated places in Dashkasan District